T. giganteus may refer to:
 Tarchia giganteus, an ankylosaurid dinosaur species from the late Cretaceous of Mongolia
 Titanus giganteus, the titan beetle, the largest known beetle species found in the Amazon rainforest
 Trichophassus giganteus, a moth species endemic to Brazil